The mountain of the Cross of the Three Kingdoms (in Spanish Cruz de los Tres Reinos) is near the civil parish of Arroyo Cerezo, that belongs to the municipality of Castielfabib, in the comarca of the Rincón de Ademuz, province of Valencia (Valencian Community). It belongs to the Montes Universales. It has 1,555 m of elevation.

Etymology 

Its denominations is caused because in that place were the borders of three kingdoms: the Kingdom of Aragon, the Kingdom of Valencia and the Kingdom of Castile. The tradition says that in the medieval times, the king of both crowns (the king of Castile, and the king of Aragon, who was also king of Valencia), met in that place to discuss about their problems.

Bibliography 
 Montesinos, J. y Poyato, C. (Ed.): Actas del Primer Simposio de La Cruz de los Tres Reinos. Espacio y tiempo en un territorio de frontera. Simposio Interregional Interuniversitario, celebrado en Ademuz el 25, 26 y 27 de julio de 2008. Edición de la Universitat de València y de la Universidad de Castilla-La Mancha. Cuenca, 2011. .

External links 
 Blog La Cruz de los Tres Reinos
 Página web del INSTITUTO CULTURAL Y DE ESTUDIOS DEL RINCÓN DE ADEMUZ y su revista ABABOL 
 Arte y patrimonio en el Rincón de Ademuz

Rincón de Ademuz